Emmy Zehden (1900–1944) was a German Jehovah's Witness executed by the Nazis.

Personal life
Zehden was born 28 March 1900 in Lübbecke.  She worked in domestic service and in 1918 moved to Berlin where she met Richard Zehden, a Jewish businessman; they married in the mid-1920s.

Religion, resistance and death
In 1930, Zehden joined the Jehovah's Witnesses. In 1938, her husband was imprisoned for a year for his membership of the same faith. The couple had a foster-son, Horst Schmidt, who refused to do military service because of his Jehovah's Witness beliefs. Zehden hid Horst and two of his companions who were also refusing to do military service, but they were discovered and all four were sentenced to death. Horst's two companions were beheaded, and although Zehden appealed for clemency she was also beheaded, on 9 June 1944 in Plötzensee Prison in Berlin. Horst was not executed, and married a Jehovah's Witness who had survived a concentration camp.

Legacy

A street in Berlin was named Emmy-Zehden-Weg in Zehden's memory in 1992. A Stolperstein commemorates her outside 32 Franzstraße, Wilhelmstadt.

Her foster-son Horst Schmidt wrote Der Tod kam immer montags : verfolgt als Kriegsdienstverweigerer im Nationalsozialismus; eine Autobiographie (2003, Essen: Klartext-Verlag) which has been published in English as Death always came on Mondays : persecuted for refusing to serve in the Nazi army : an autobiography (2005, Copenhagen: Gramma Books) and described as giving "insight into Horst's forster-mother Emmy Zehden's remarkable life".

References

1900 births
1944 deaths
German Jehovah's Witnesses
Protestants in the German Resistance
Female resistance members of World War II